Ruen is a village in southeastern Bulgaria, part of Burgas Province. It is the administrative centre of Ruen municipality, which lies in the northern part of Burgas Province.

Municipality

Ruen municipality includes the following 41 places:

The population of the municipality is predominantly Turkish (see Turks in Bulgaria), with some Bulgarians, Roma and Pomaks.

Villages in Burgas Province